Dreamland is the second studio album by American band Beat Circus.  It was released on January 29, 2008 by Cuneiform Records, and shares its title with the turn-of-the-century Coney Island theme park which burned in a devastating fire in 1911.  The album is a 150-page score for 9 musicians composed and arranged by Brian Carpenter and produced by Martin Bisi.  Album artwork was created by Brian Dewan, who also performed electric zither on the album.  Dreamland marks the first installment of Carpenter's Weird American Gothic trilogy.

Track listing
All music and lyrics by Brian Carpenter, except "Dark Eyes" and "Meet Me Tonight in Dreamland". Recorded in 2006 by Martin Bisi at his B.C. Studios in Brooklyn, New York.

 "Gyp the Blood" – 2:22
 "The Ghost of Emma Jean" – 4:43
 "Hypnogogia" – 1:02
 "Delirium Tremens" – 4:06
 "Lucid State" – 1:04
 "Death Fugue" – 3:11
 "The Good Witch" – 0:44
 "Dark Eyes" – 3:01
 "Slavochka" – 4:08
 "The Gem Saloon" – 3:26
 "El Torero" – 1:20
 "The Rough Riders" – 4:19
 "Coney Island Creepshow" – 3:32
 "Hell Gate" – 2:37
 "Meet Me Tonight in Dreamland" – 3:07
 "March of the Freaks" – 2:24

Musicians
 Brian Carpenter - Vocals, Harmonica, Pump Organ, Trumpet, Toy Piano, Tambourine, Slide Trumpet, Percussion
 Alec K. Redfearn - Accordion, Jawharp
 Brandon Seabrook - Tenor Banjo, Slide Guitar, Mandolin
 Kaethe Hostetter - Violin, Viola
 Julia Kent - Cello
 Briggan Krauss - Alto Saxophone, Baritone Saxophone
 Matt McLaren - Drums, Brake Drums, Washboard, Percussion
 Ron Caswell - Tuba
 Curtis Hasselbring - Trombone
 Brian Dewan - Electric Zither
 Chris Jenkins - Viola
 Steven Berson - Cello
 Helen Yee - Violin
 Michael Hearst - Theremin
 Sxip Shirey - Bells, Triple-Extended Pennywhistle, Breath Blasts
 Jesse Sparhawk - Harp
 Todd Robbins - Upright Piano
 Frank Difficult - Electronics
 Orion Rigel Dommisse - Vocals
 Holly Brewer - Vocals
 M@ McNiss - Vocals
 DJ Hazard - Outside Talker

Performances
Brian Carpenter, Alec K. Redfearn, Kaethe Hostetter, Julia Kent, Brandon Seabrook, Briggan Krauss, Curtis Hasselbring, Ron Caswell, and Matt McLaren performed this material live in 2006 at several music venues in NYC, including Tonic, Brooklyn Academy Of Music, and Barbes.

Trivia
Brian Dewan contributed the cover illustration and played electric zither on "Coney Island Creepshow", "Hell Gate", and "March Of The Freaks".
Magician, sideshow performer, and Coney Island alum Todd Robbins performed on "Meet Me Tonight In Dreamland" on an upright solo piano in Martin Bisi's B.C. Studios.
Veteran stand-up comedian DJ Hazard performed on "Coney Island Creepshow" as the outside talker.

References

Beat Circus albums
2008 albums
Cuneiform Records albums
Albums produced by Martin Bisi